Maizania elatior is a species of gastropod belonging to the family Maizaniidae.

The species is found in Africa.

References

Maizaniidae